The following Union Army and Union Navy units and commanders fought in the Battle of Island Number Ten during the American Civil War.

Abbreviations used

Military rank
 MG = Major General
 BG = Brigadier General
 Col = Colonel
 Ltc = Lieutenant Colonel
 Maj = Major
 Cpt = Captain
 Lt = Lieutenant

Other
 w = wounded
 mw = mortally wounded
 k = killed

Army of the Mississippi
Major General John Pope

Assistant Adjutant General: Maj Speed Butler
Assistant Inspector General: Maj John M. Corse
Siege Train: Cpt Joseph A. Mower
Medical Director: Surgeon O. W. Nixon

Union Navy Western Flotilla
Flag Officer Andrew H. Foote
17k, 34w, 3m = 54

American Civil War orders of battle